Hydrodamalinae is a recently extinct subfamily of the sirenian family Dugongidae.  The Steller's sea cow (Hydrodamalis gigas) was hunted to extinction by 1768, while the genus Dusisiren is known from fossils dating from the middle Miocene to early Pliocene.

References

Notes

Sources

 

 (PDF)

 

Sirenians
Extinct mammals
Mammal subfamilies
Miocene first appearances
Holocene extinctions